Christopher Salon Avevor (born 11 February 1992) is a German professional footballer who plays as a centre-back who plays for 2. Bundesliga club FC St. Pauli. He represented Germany internationally at various youth levels.

Career
On 29 May 2016, with his Fortuna Düsseldorf expiring at the end of the 2015–16 season, Avevor signed a three-year deal with FC St. Pauli.

Personal life
Avevor's father Hope is from Ghana, while his mother Manuela is German. He grew up in the small village of Felmerholz. He has represant the Germany U21 and U19.

Career statistics

Club

References

External links
 

1992 births
German sportspeople of Ghanaian descent
Living people
Sportspeople from Kiel
German footballers
Footballers from Schleswig-Holstein
Association football defenders
Germany youth international footballers
Bundesliga players
2. Bundesliga players
Hannover 96 II players
Hannover 96 players
FC St. Pauli players
Fortuna Düsseldorf players